Philipp Ernst Maria, 8th Prince of Hohenlohe-Waldenburg-Schillingsfürst (b. Schillingsfürst, 5 June 1853 – d. Bad Reichenhall, 26 December 1915).

Early life
Philipp Ernst Maria was the eldest son of Chlodwig, Prince of Hohenlohe-Schillingsfürst in Schillingsfürst and his wife, Princess Marie of Sayn-Wittgenstein-Sayn.

Personal life
On January 10, 1882, he married Princess Chariclée Ypsilanti (b. Paris, 8 October 1863 - d. Schillingsfürst, 22 June 1912) in Vienna. The marriage produced two daughters who died in infancy:

 Stephanie (b. and d. Schillingsfürst, 23 September 1882)
 Maria (b. Podiebrady, 7 August 1886 - d. Podiebrady, 19 January 1897).

After the death of Princess Marie, he married morganatically in Edinburgh on 6 August 1913 to actress Henriette Gindra (b. Vienna, 7 October 1884 - d. Innsbruck, 15 May 1952). She was created Frau von Hellberg on July 10, 1914. She was 31 years younger than him. The couple had a son:

 Alexander von Hellberg (b. Munich, 19 March 1914 - killed in battle, Givors, 24 August 1944), who married Helga Lüth in Munich on 27 February 1937.

Philipp Ernst Maria died on December 26, 1915 in Bad Reichenhall without a male heir. His brother, Maurice, became Prince of Hohenlohe-Schillingsfürst.

References

|- 

1853 births
1915 deaths
Philipp Ernst
Members of the Bavarian Reichsrat